Sergei Scherbov (born 1952) is a demographer specializing in demographic analysis and population projection. He is Deputy Program Leader with the World Population Program (POP) at IIASA (International Institute for Applied Systems Analysis) since 2013 and Leader of the Population Dynamics and Forecasting Group at the Vienna Institute of Demography of the Austrian Academy of Sciences since 2002.

From 1993 to 2002, Scherbov was a researcher and lecturer at the Population Research Centre, at the University of Groningen. He worked on the issues of population projections and development of software for population studies at IIASA since 1986, is leading scientist at the institute since 1992 and project leader since 2013. He is further Director of Demographic Analysis at the Wittgenstein Centre for Demography and Global Human Capital since 2011 and Guest Professor at the WU-Vienna University of Economics and Business.

Scherbov holds a Ph.D. in Theory of Systems, Control Theory and Systems Analysis from All-Union Research Institute for Systems Studies of the USSR Academy of Sciences, Moscow, Russia (1983).

Scherbov has worked on demographic modeling, probabilistic population projections, applications of multistate demography, data processing and presentation, measuring aging in ways that take life expectancy change into account, and modeling of disability. He has done much research on the demography of the former Soviet Union. Dr. Scherbov is author, co-author, or co-editor of several books as well as numerous articles published in professional journals, including Nature, Science, and Population and Development Review.

Based on this research in 2012 he received a European Research Council ERC-Advanced Grant to develop new approaches to the study of age and ageing that are appropriate for 21st century conditions. Among other things, the project will ascertain the extent to which advanced societies are actually ageing in multiple dimensions, including health, cognitive abilities, and longevity. By addressing such fundamental issues this project will likely have a pronounced impact on future population ageing research.

Selected publications
Marois, G., Muttarak R., & Scherbov S. (2020). Assessing the potential impact of COVID-19 on life expectancy. PLOS ONE, 15(9): e0238678
Gietel-Basten, S., Saucedo S.E.G., & Scherbov S. (2020). Prospective measures of aging for Central and South America. PLOS ONE, 15(7): e0236280. DOI:10.1371/journal.pone.0236280.
Weber, D., & Scherbov S. (2020). Prospects of activity limitations among older adults in 23 low and middle income countries. Scientific Reports, 10(1) DOI:10.1038/s41598-020-67166-4.
Sanderson, W.C., & Scherbov S. (2020). Choosing between the UN's alternative views of population aging. PLOS ONE, 15(7): e0233602. DOI:10.1371/journal.pone.0233602.
Philipov, D., & Scherbov S. (2020). Subjective length of life of European individuals at older ages: Temporal and gender distinctions. PLOS ONE, 15(3): e0229975. DOI:10.1371/journal.pone.0229975.
Sanderson, W.C., Scherbov S. (2019). Prospective Longevity: A New Vision of Population Aging. Cambridge, MA: Harvard University Press.
Ghislandi, S., Sanderson W.C., & Scherbov S. (2018). A Simple Measure of Human Development: The Human Life Indicator. Population and Development Review, 45(1): 219–233. https://doi.org/10.1111/padr.12205.
Sanderson, W.C., & Scherbov, S. (2015). Are we overly dependent on conventional dependency ratios? Population and Development Review, 41(4), 687–708.

Notes

External links
 Wittgenstein Centre for Demography and Global Human Capital
 World Population Program at the International Institute for Applied Systems Analysis
 Vienna Institute of Demography

1950 births
Living people
Russian demographers